= Scarlet Hill =

Hill in Australia

Scarlet Hill (53°6′S 73°40′E) is an ice-free, rounded hill, 410 m, overlooking Skua Beach on the east side of Heard Island. This feature appears to have been roughly charted on an 1874 chart by a British expedition under Nares in the Challenger. It was surveyed and named by the ANARE (Australian National Antarctic Research Expeditions) in 1948.
