= Skua Beach =

Beach on Heard Island

- Beach
- Interactive map of Skua Beach
- Coordinates: 53°5′S 73°41′E
- Location: Scarlet Hill, Heard Island, Antarctica

Skua Beach (53°5′S 73°41′E) is a sandy beach lying at the base of Scarlet Hill on the east side of Heard Island. The name Launches Beach appears to have had some usage by American sealers as shown by an unpublished sealer's map of "Hurds Island" of the 1860–70 period. The name Skua Beach was given by ANARE (Australian National Antarctic Research Expeditions) during its 1948 survey of the island and is now established in usage.
